Vasavilan is a small town in Sri Lanka.  It is located within Northern Province.

See also
 List of towns in Northern Province, Sri Lanka

External links

 Vasavilan.net

Populated places in Northern Province, Sri Lanka